is a Japanese former professional footballer who played as a goalkeeper. He played for Japan national team.

Club career
After graduating from Nara Ikuei High School in 1995, Narazaki joined J1 League side Yokohama Flügels. In August 1995, regular goalkeeper Atsuhiko Mori was suspended for three months due to violence against referee. On 16 August 1995, Narazaki debuted against Bellmare Hiratsuka instead Mori and Narazaki became a regular goalkeeper. In 1996 season, Flügels finished at the third place and he was also selected Best Eleven award. He contributed to the club winning the 1998 Emperor's Cup. However Flügels was merged with cross-town Yokohama Marinos and Flügels was dissolved end of 1998 season.

In 1999, Narazaki moved to Nagoya Grampus Eight (later Nagoya Grampus) with teammate Motohiro Yamaguchi at Flügels. In 1999, Grampus won the champions in Emperor's Cup for two years in a row for him. In 2008, Grampus signed with new manager Dragan Stojković who was teammate in Grampus until 2001. Grampus under Stojković reached third place in J1 League and Narazaki was selected Best Eleven award. In 2010, Grampus won the champions in J1 League first time in the club history. Narazaki also became the first goalkeeper to receive the J.League Most Valuable Player award. In 2016 season, Grampus finished at the 16th place of 18 clubs and was relegated to J2 League first time in the club history. In 2017 J2 League, the club became third place and was returned to J1. However his opportunity to play decreased behind Yohei Takeda until summer. In 2018, Narazaki could not play at all in the match behind new player Mitchell Langerak.

Narazaki announced his retirement from football on 8 January 2019.  He was 42 years old.

International career
On 15 February 1998, Narazaki made his international debut for Japan national team against Australia. After the debut, he battles with Yoshikatsu Kawaguchi for the position for 10 years. He was selected Japan for 1998 World Cup. However, Kawaguchi played in Japan’s three matches at the tournament.

In 2000, Narazaki was selected Japan U23 national team as over age for 2000 Summer Olympics and played full time in all 4 matches. Although he could hardly play in the match in 2001, he played many matches in 2002. At 2002 World Cup in Japan, he played all 4 matches and Japan qualified to the knockout stage first time in their history.

Narazaki played many matches as regular goalkeeper until summer 2004. Although he was selected Japan for 2004 Asian Cup, he could not play for injury. His rival Kawaguchi performed brilliantly at Asian Cup and Japan won the champions. After Asian Cup, Narazaki lost regular position behind Kawaguchi. Although Narazaki was selected Japan for 2006 World Cup, he did not play in a match.

Although Narazaki could not play many matches until 2007, he became a regular goalkeeper because Kawaguchi was injured in 2008. Narazaki was named in the 2010 World Cup squad as one of two Japanese players (the other being Kawaguchi) to be selected for 4 consecutive World Cups. However, despite performing impressively in the qualifiers, he was benched for the tournament in favour of his former understudy Eiji Kawashima. He would make one last appearance for Japan when he captained the team to a 2–1 victory over Guatemala on 7 September 2010 before retiring from international duty. He played 77 games for Japan.

Career statistics

Club

International

Honors
Yokohama Flügels
 Emperor's Cup: 1998

Nagoya Grampus
 J1 League: 2010
 Emperor's Cup: 1999
 Japanese Super Cup: 2011

Japan
 AFC Asian Cup: 2004

Individual
 J.League Most Valuable Player: 2010
 J.League Best Eleven: 1996, 1998, 2003, 2008, 2010, 2011

References

External links
 
 
 Japan National Football Team Database
 
 Profile at Nagoya Grampus

1976 births
Living people
Association football people from Nara Prefecture
Japanese footballers
Japan international footballers
J1 League players
J2 League players
Yokohama Flügels players
Nagoya Grampus players
J1 League Player of the Year winners
Olympic footballers of Japan
Footballers at the 2000 Summer Olympics
1996 AFC Asian Cup players
1998 FIFA World Cup players
1999 Copa América players
2001 FIFA Confederations Cup players
2002 FIFA World Cup players
2003 FIFA Confederations Cup players
2004 AFC Asian Cup players
2005 FIFA Confederations Cup players
2006 FIFA World Cup players
2007 AFC Asian Cup players
2010 FIFA World Cup players
AFC Asian Cup-winning players
Association football goalkeepers